Donogoo Tonka is a 1936 German comedy film directed by Reinhold Schünzel and starring Anny Ondra, Viktor Staal and Will Dohm. It is based on a play of the same name by Jules Romains. A separate French-language version Donogoo was also made. The film was produced by UFA at the Babelsberg Studios in Berlin, with sets designed by Otto Hunte and Willy Schiller.

Cast
 Anny Ondra as Josette
 Viktor Staal as Pierre Lamendin
 Will Dohm as Albert
 Heinz Salfner as Trouhadec
 Aribert Wäscher as Margajat
 Oskar Sima as Broudier
 Paul Bildt as Rufisque
 Albert Florath as Voisin
 Rudolf Platte as Simplou
 Tine Schneider as Sekretärin
 Ewald Wenck as Beamter
 Ernst Behmer as Polizist
 Olga Limburg as Direktrice
 Franz Weber as Verkäufer
 Carl Auen as Auswanderer
 Beppo Brem as Auswanderer
 Arthur Reinhardt as Auswanderer
 Walter von Allwoerden as Auswanderer
 Jac Diehl as Auswanderer
 Max Schreck as Auswanderer
 Herbert Weissbach
 Elisabeth Neumann-Viertel as Auswandererfrau
 Jutta von Wedel as Auswandererfrau

References

Bibliography 
 Kreimeier, Klaus. The Ufa Story: A History of Germany's Greatest Film Company, 1918–1945. University of California Press, 1999.

External links 
 

1936 films
Films of Nazi Germany
German comedy films
1936 comedy films
1930s German-language films
Films directed by Reinhold Schünzel
German multilingual films
UFA GmbH films
Films shot at Babelsberg Studios
German black-and-white films
1936 multilingual films
1930s German films